is a Japanese water polo player. She was selected to the Japan women's national water polo team, for the 2020 Summer Olympics.

She participated in the 2019 Summer Universiade. 

She plays for Shumei University.

References 

1999 births
Living people
Japanese female water polo players
Olympic water polo players of Japan
Water polo players at the 2020 Summer Olympics
21st-century Japanese women